Caius Calpurnius Asclepiades of Prusa (aka "Phylophysicus", one of several men referred to as Asclepiades of Prusa) was an eminent physician who flourished in the second century during the reign of Hadrian. Born in Prusia, Bithynia in 88 CE, he wrote several books on the composition of medicines, both internal and external. The Greek physician Galen recorded some of Asclepiades' medical formulas in his works. He was presented by emperor Trajan with the revenues of seven cities for himself and his family and served as one of the assessors of Roman magistrates in charge of voting tablets.
The biographer Antonio Cocchi noted that there were over forty men of history with the name Asclepiades and wrote that this Asclepiades of Prusa was a fellow countryman of, and perhaps a lineal descendant of the Asclepiades who died in 40 BCE.
 
He was married to Veronia Chelidonia for 51 years and died aged 70.

See also
Asclepiades (disambiguation)

References

Further reading

2nd-century Greek physicians
2nd-century Greek people
People from Bithynia
88 births
158 deaths